James William Ercolani (born June 8, 1936) known by his stage name James Darren, is an American television and film actor, television director, and singer. During the late 1950s and early 1960s, he had notable starring and supporting roles in films including Gidget (1959) and its sequels, The Gene Krupa Story (1959), All the Young Men (1960), The Guns of Navarone (1961), and Diamond Head (1962). As a teen pop singer, he achieved hit singles including "Goodbye Cruel World" in 1961. He later became more active in television, starring as Dr. Anthony Newman in the science fiction series The Time Tunnel (1966–1967). He appeared in the regular role of Officer III James Corrigan in the police drama T. J. Hooker (1983–1986) and in the recurring role of Vic Fontaine in Star Trek: Deep Space Nine (1998–1999).

Early life 
Darren was born in the Lower Moyamensing neighborhood of Philadelphia, on June 8, 1936. He is of Italian descent.

He wanted to be an actor and studied in New York City with Stella Adler for a number of years. He would also occasionally sing although he later said "I wasn't really a singer. I was a kid in Philly whose dad would take him to bars and nightclubs and I would get up and sing two songs."

Career 
Darren was discovered by talent agent and casting director Joyce Selznick after he got some photographs taken by Maurice Seymour to show potential agents:
His secretary, a woman by the name of Yvonne Bouvier, asked me if I was interested in getting into film. I said yeah, I was. She said I know someone you should meet. She set up a meeting between me and Joyce Selznick, who worked for Screen Gems. I went down to 1650 Broadway, the Brill Building. On my way to a meeting with Joyce, we just happened to get on the elevator at the same time. She kept staring at me. I never met her. She never met me. We got off at the same floor and walked to the same office. That was our meeting. Joyce brought me over to Columbia Pictures about a week later and got me a contract there.

Columbia 
Columbia signed Darren to a long-term contract in July 1956. A few weeks later he was filming his first film, Rumble on the Docks (1956), a low budget "B" movie produced by Sam Katzman, where Darren played the lead. Darren's appearance was well received and he got a lot of fan mail – second at the studio only to Kim Novak.

Darren guest starred on an episode of TV's The Web ("Kill and Run") then Columbia gave him a support role in an "A" picture, the comedy Operation Mad Ball (1957), starring Jack Lemmon and Ernie Kovacs.

He had support roles in two films directed by Phil Karlson: The Brothers Rico (1957), a film noir, playing the brother of Richard Conte; and Gunman's Walk (1958), a Western with Van Heflin and Tab Hunter. In between he was second billed in another movie for Katzman, The Tijuana Story (1957), although his role was relatively small.

Gidget and singing 

Darren was third billed in the surf film, Gidget (1959), starring Sandra Dee and Cliff Robertson, playing Moondoggie, essentially the film's leading man. He also sang the title track. "They were thinking about having someone do the vocal and I would lip sync", he recalled. "I told them I could do it. So we went into one of the sound stages and I sang 'Gidget'. They said, 'He sings fine,' then I did all the other songs."

The film was a hit with teen audiences and so was the song. Darren wound up recording a string of pop hits for Colpix Records, the biggest of which was "Goodbye Cruel World" (#3 on the Billboard Hot 100 in 1961). It sold over one million copies, and was awarded a gold disc. He also recorded this song in excellent Italian, as "Addio Mondo Crudele", which was very successful in Europe. Another sizeable hit was "Her Royal Majesty" (#6 on the Billboard Hot 100 in 1962). He is also featured in one of the Scopitone series of pop music video jukebox films ("Because You're Mine").

Twice, in 1959 and 1961, Darren played teen idols on episodes of The Donna Reed Show. He did an episode of The Lineup (1959).

Darren was third billed in a series of films for Columbia: The Gene Krupa Story (1959), a biopic with Sal Mineo; All the Young Men (1960), a Korean War movie with Alan Ladd and Sidney Poitier; and Let No Man Write My Epitaph (1960) with Burl Ives and Shelley Winters, which was a sequel to Knock On Any Door (1949). He had a cameo as himself in a teen film, Because They're Young (1960), singing the title track.

Darren had a supporting role in the World War II film The Guns of Navarone (1961), a huge hit at the box office. However, Darren later said "The people handling my career at that point didn't really take advantage of it." Also popular was Gidget Goes Hawaiian (1961) where Darren reprised his role as Moondoggie; he had a new Gidget (Deborah Walley) and was given top billing.

Darren had a good support role in a melodrama, Diamond Head (1962) with Charlton Heston. He played Moondoggie a third time in Gidget Goes to Rome (1962) which he later said he "hated... I didn't want to do it. I thought that I'd be doing those for the rest of my life." He sang the title track for Under the Yum Yum Tree (1963).

Universal 
In 1963 Darren signed a seven-picture deal with Universal, starting with The Lively Set (1963). That teamed him with Pamela Tiffin, who was also in For Those Who Think Young (1964), a teen film Darren made for United Artists.

He was the singing voice of Yogi Bear in the animated film, Hey There, It's Yogi Bear! (1964), on the song "Ven-e, Ven-o, Ven-a". Prior to that, he was the singing voice of his own character "Jimmy Darrock" on an episode of The Flintstones. However, the character's dialogue was provided by voice actor Lennie Weinrib.

Irwin Allen 
Darren guest starred on an episode of Voyage to the Bottom of the Sea as an Android Omar, that was produced by Irwin Allen. Allen then cast Darren in the lead of a series, as impulsive scientist and adventurer Tony Newman on the science fiction series, The Time Tunnel (1966–1967) with Robert Colbert and Lee Meriwether. When the series ended, Allen shot a brief pilot for a new series starring Darren, The Man from the 25th Century, but it was not picked up.

Darren then went to Europe to make Venus in Furs (1969) for Jess Franco then was reunited with Allen in City Beneath the Sea (1971).

TV guest star 
In the 1970s, Darren performed regularly in night clubs. He focused on guest starring on TV series, such as Love, American Style; S.W.A.T.; Police Woman; Black Sheep Squadron; The Feather and Father Gang; Charlie's Angels; Police Story; Hawaii Five-O; Vegas; The Love Boat; and Fantasy Island.

He had a role in the TV movie The Lives of Jenny Dolan (1975) and the film The Boss' Son (1978).

In the early 1980s Darren appeared on Scruples (1981), and One Day at a Time.

Portrait of a Legend 
In the late 1970s and early 1980s, Darren was the host of Portrait of a Legend, a weekly show in which he would conduct an interview with a popular musician about their career interspersed with classic performance footage of that artist. Artists who appeared included Jerry Lee Lewis, Little Richard, Sly Stone, and Herb Alpert. The show appeared mostly on PBS.

TJ Hooker and directing 
Later Darren had a regular role as Officer III James Corrigan on the television police drama T. J. Hooker from 1983 to 1986.

"Every career has its hills and valleys", Darren said in 1983. "The most important thing is that you are happy with you. Not anybody's career, no one that I know of, has always been climbing. It always levels out and you want to make sure you have good investments and financial security and bread on the table. If projects aren't coming to you, then you seek them out and you try to develop and put projects together."

He directed some episodes and launched a career as a director, notably of action-based series, including Hunter, The A-Team, Silk Stalkings, Renegade, and Nowhere Man, as well as dramas such as Beverly Hills, 90210 and Melrose Place.

He continued to act on such shows as Raven.

Deep Space Nine 
In 1998, he achieved renewed popularity as a singer through his appearances on Star Trek: Deep Space Nine in the role of holographic crooner and adviser Vic Fontaine. His role in Deep Space Nine inspired his return to singing. Many of his vocal performances on the show were re-recorded for the album This One's from the Heart (1999). The album shows Darren, a close friend of Frank Sinatra, comfortably singing in the Sinatra style. The 2001 follow-up Because of You showed similar inspiration from Tony Bennett.

Later appearances include Random Acts (2001) and Lucky (2017).

Personal life 

In 1955, Darren married Gloria Terlitsky, his sweetheart since 1953. Her father opposed their marriage because Terlitsky was Jewish while Darren was Catholic. Darren and Terlitsky had son James Jr. ("Jimmy"), and divorced in 1958. Jimmy was adopted by Gloria's third husband, and is now known as journalist and TV commentator Jim Moret.

Two years after the divorce, Darren married Evy Norlund, Miss Denmark 1958. They had two sons, Christian (born c. 1960) and Anthony (born c. 1964).

Selected discography

Singles

Albums 
 1960 James Darren No. 1 (reissued 2004)
 1961 Sings the Movies (Gidget Goes Hawaiian)
 1962 Love Among the Young (reissued 2004)
 1962 Sings for All Sizes
 1963 Bye Bye Birdie (with The Marcels, Paul Petersen and Shelley Fabares)
 1963 Teenage Triangle (with Shelley Fabares and Paul Petersen)
 1964 More Teenage Triangle (with Paul Petersen and Shelley Fabares)
 1967 All (reissued 2005)
 1971 Mammy Blue
 1972 Love Songs from the Movies
 1994 The Best of James Darren
 1999 This One's from the Heart
 2001 Because of You
 2019 Live! For The First Time

Many compilation albums also exist.

Filmography

TV appearances

References

External links 

 
 
 

1936 births
Living people
American male film actors
American male singers
American male television actors
American people of Italian descent
American television directors
Colpix Records artists
Musicians from Philadelphia
Male actors from Philadelphia
Singers from Pennsylvania